The 2019 Big Ten Conference men's soccer tournament was the 29th edition of the tournament. It determined the Big Ten Conference's automatic berth into the 2019 NCAA Division I men's soccer tournament. Maryland hosted the semifinal and final rounds of the tournament.

Defending champions, Indiana, successfully defended their title, giving the program their 13th Big Ten Tournament championship. They defeated Michigan in the final in a penalty shoot-out.

Seeding 

Seeding was determined by regular season conference records.

Bracket

Results

First round

Quarterfinals

Semifinals

B1G Championship

All-Tournament team 

 Tournament Offensive MVP: Jack Hallahan
 Tournament Defensive MVP: Jack Maher

All-Tournament team:

 Spencer Glass, Indiana
 Jack Maher, Indiana
 Aidan Morris, Indiana
 Niklas Neumann, Maryland
 Jack Hallahan, Michigan
 Abdou Samake, Michigan

 Patrick Nielsen, Michigan State
 Matt Moderwell, Northwestern
 Joe Ortiz, Ohio State
 Aaron Molloy, Penn State
 Zach Klancnik, Wisconsin

References

External links 
 Big Ten Conference Men's Soccer
 Big Ten Men's Soccer Tournament Central

Big Ten Men's Soccer Tournament
Big Ten Conference Men's Soccer
Big Ten Conference Men's Soccer
Big Ten Conference Men's Soccer
Big Ten Conference Men's Soccer
Big Ten Conference Men's Soccer
Big Ten Conference Men's Soccer Tournament